Morshedul Islam (born 1 December 1958) is a Bangladeshi film director. His notable films include Agami (1984), Chaka (1993), Dipu Number Two (1996), Dukhai (1997), Khelaghor (2006), Durotto (2006) and Amar Bondhu Rashed (2011).

Biography
Islam was born on 1 December 1958 in Dhaka. He made his film-making debut in 1984 with the short film Agami while he was a student. Film critic Ahmed Muztaba Zamal, writing in Cinemaya in 2000, named Islam's Chaka as one of the top twelve films from Bangladesh.

Filmography
 Agami (1984)
 Nouka O Jibon (1986)
 Shuchona (1988)
 Chaka (The Wheel, 1993)
 Dipu Number Two (1996)
 Dukhai (1997)
 Brishty (2000)
 Shorot 71 (2000)
 Durotto (2004)
 Khelaghor (2006)
 Vooter Bari (2007)
 Priyotomeshu (2009)
 Amar Bondhu Rashed (2011)
 Anil Bagchir Ekdin (2015)
 Ankhi O Tar Bandhura (2017)

Awards and honours

 International Critics Award in International Filmfestival Mannheim-Heidelberg in 1983
 Best telefilm, National Film Award 1984
 Bangladesh National Film Award for Best Director, 2015, Anil Bagchir Ekdin (jointly with Reazul Mowla Rezu's Bapjaner Bioscope)

References

External links
 
 Morshedul Islam at Cholochitro.com
 

1958 births
Bangladeshi film directors
Living people
Best Film Directing Meril-Prothom Alo Critics Choice Award winners
Best Director National Film Award (Bangladesh) winners